Aleksandr Georgiyevich Shidlovsky (born 1 February 1941 in Moscow) is a Russian water polo player who competed for the Soviet Union in the 1968 Summer Olympics and in the 1972 Summer Olympics.

His son Alexandr Shidlovskiy, became also a water polo player and competed at the 2004 Summer Olympics.

See also
 Soviet Union men's Olympic water polo team records and statistics
 List of Olympic champions in men's water polo
 List of Olympic medalists in water polo (men)

References

External links
 

1941 births
Living people
Soviet male water polo players
Russian male water polo players
Olympic water polo players of the Soviet Union
Water polo players at the 1968 Summer Olympics
Water polo players at the 1972 Summer Olympics
Olympic gold medalists for the Soviet Union
Olympic silver medalists for the Soviet Union
Olympic medalists in water polo
Sportspeople from Moscow
Medalists at the 1972 Summer Olympics
Medalists at the 1968 Summer Olympics